Ifran Hossain (born 4 April 1996) is a Bangladeshi cricketer. He made his first-class debut for Chittagong Division in the 2018–19 National Cricket League on 1 October 2018. He made his Twenty20 debut for Khelaghar Samaj Kallyan Samity in the 2018–19 Dhaka Premier Division Twenty20 Cricket League on 25 February 2019. He made his List A debut for Khelaghar Samaj Kallyan Samity in the 2018–19 Dhaka Premier Division Cricket League on 9 March 2019.

References

External links
 

1996 births
Living people
Bangladeshi cricketers
Chittagong Division cricketers
Khelaghar Samaj Kallyan Samity cricketers
People from Chittagong